"Kooks" is a song written by English singer-songwriter David Bowie, which appears on his 1971 album Hunky Dory.  Bowie wrote this song to his newborn son Duncan Jones. The song was a pastiche of early 1970s Neil Young because Bowie was listening to a Neil Young record at home on 30 May 1971 when he got the news of the arrival of his son.

Live versions
 Before the studio recording of the song was made, it was recorded for the BBC In Concert radio show with John Peel, on 3 June 1971 (broadcast on 20 June 1971). In 2000 this recording was released on the Bowie at the Beeb album.
 The song was recorded again for the BBC "Sounds of the 70s" radio show with Bob Harris on 21 September 1971 (broadcast on 4 October 1971).

Personnel
David Bowie: lead and backing vocals, acoustic guitar
Mick Ronson: string arrangement
Trevor Bolder: bass, trumpet
Mick Woodmansey: drums
Rick Wakeman: piano

In popular culture

 The first three lines of the song ("Will you stay in our lovers' story / If you stay, you won't be sorry / 'Cause we believe in you") are used as a repeated motif in Miranda July's 2015 novel The First Bad Man
 The British indie band The Kooks named themselves after the song.

References

Notes

Other sources 
 Pegg, Nicholas (0200), The Complete David Bowie, Reynolds & Hearn Ltd, 

1971 songs
David Bowie songs
Songs written by David Bowie
Song recordings produced by Ken Scott
Song recordings produced by David Bowie